Bartkowiak is a Polish surname. Notable people with the surname include:

 Adrian Bartkowiak (born 1987), Polish footballer
 Andrzej Bartkowiak (born 1950), Polish cinematographer
 Hans Bartkowiak, Nazi German military officer
 Michał Bartkowiak (born 1997), Polish footballer
 Piotr Bartkowiak (born 1975), Polish footballer

See also
 Bartkowiak (film), a 2021 Polish film
 

Polish-language surnames